Korea DPR participated in the 2018 Asian Games in Jakarta and Palembang, Indonesia from 18 August to 2 September 2018. Korea DPR made its first appearance at the Asian Games in 1974 Tehran, and ranked at the top five in 1974, 1978, 1982, and 1990. At the latest games in Incheon, North Korea had collected 36 medals, and standing at the seventh position in medals tally.

Medalists

The following North Korea competitors won medals at the Games.

|  style="text-align:left; width:78%; vertical-align:top;"|

|  style="text-align:left; width:22%; vertical-align:top;"|

Competitors 
The following is a list of the number of competitors representing North Korea that participated at the Games:

Archery 

Recurve

Artistic swimming 

RR: Reserved in technical and free routines.

Athletics 

North Korea entered eight athletes (3 men's and 5 women's) to participate in the athletics competition at the Games.

Boxing 

Men

Women

Canoeing

Sprint

Qualification legend: QF=Final; QS=Semifinal

Diving 

Men

Women

Football 

North Korea men's team were drawn in Group F at the Games, while the women's team in Group B. North Korea women's team were the champion in the last edition in Incheon.

Summary

Men's tournament

Roster

Group F

Round of 16

Quarter-final

Women's tournament

Roster

Group B

Quarter-final

Gymnastics

Handball 

North Korea joined in group A at the women's team event.

Summary

Women's tournament 

Roster

Ho Ryu-gyong
O Kyong-sun
Choe Chun-il
Kil Mi-hyang
An Ok-sim
Han Jong-hyang
Jang Ok-hyang
Kim Jong-hui
Mun Un-suk
Mun Hong-sim
Kim Chol-sun
Kim Un-gyong
Han Chun-yon
Choe Pong-im

 Group A

5–8th place semifinal

Fifth place game

Judo 

North Korea put up 8 athletes for Judo:

Men

Women

Karate 

North Korea participated in the karate competition at the Games with three athletes (1 men and 2 women's).

Shooting 

Men

Women

Mixed team

Soft tennis

Swimming 

Women

Table tennis 

Individual

Team

Weightlifting

North Korea is aiming to win seven to eight gold medals from their weightlifters.

Men

Women

Wrestling 

North Korea represented by 8 strong wrestlers at the Games. This sport contributing 5 medals (2 gold, 1 silver, and 2 bronze) for the contingent. The gold medals won by the women's wrestler Pak Yong-mi and Jong Myong-suk.

Men's freestyle

Men's Greco-Roman

Women's freestyle

See also
 North Korea at the 2018 Asian Para Games

References 

Nations at the 2018 Asian Games
2018
Asian Games